Igor Bališ (born 5 January 1970) is a former Slovak footballer. Bališ played for West Bromwich Albion in England. He has also appeared for Spartak Trnava and Slovan Bratislava, as well as the Slovakia national team.

Bališ joined Albion in November 2000 for £150,00. He made his Albion debut on 23 December 2000, coming on as a late substitute in a 3–0 win against Nottingham Forest. He converted a dramatic stoppage time penalty against Bradford City in the penultimate game of the 2001–02 season, which put Albion on the brink of promotion to the Premier League. 

Albion were on an unbeaten 8 game run coming into the match with Bradford but the game had been played out as an attritional 0-0, with both sides unable to score when Bob Taylor was brought down in the 90th minute of the game to secure the penalty. Despite the opportunity to score it was uncertain who was going to take the spot kick as Albion had missed 8 of the 11 penalties they had been awarded that season, the clubs recognized strikers, Scott Dobie and Bob Taylor had both missed one. Balis volunteered to take the spot kick, despite never having taken one in a professional game before, a fact both his manager, Gary Megson, and his playing colleagues were unaware of. He scored shooting low and to the right of the goalkeeper. The penalty secured a 1-0 victory and Albion’s victory kept the possibility of promotion in their hands and local rivals Wolverhampton Wanderers F.C. would be unable to catch them in the final day unless Albion lost.

April 13th, the date of the match with Bradford City, is celebrated by West Bromwich Albion fans as ‘Igor Balis Day’ in recognition of the importance of scoring the penalty that took the club to the premier league. 

After completing a season in the Premiership with Albion, Bališ quit the club and returned home to Slovakia, after suffering a recurrence of tinnitus.

References

External links
 
 

1970 births
Living people
People from Trnava District
Sportspeople from the Trnava Region
FC Spartak Trnava players
ŠK Slovan Bratislava players
West Bromwich Albion F.C. players
Slovak footballers
Slovak expatriate footballers
Slovak Super Liga players
Premier League players
Slovakia international footballers
Association football fullbacks
Expatriate footballers in England
Slovak expatriate sportspeople in England